Marshall Kent may refer to:

Marshall Kent (actor) (1908−1985), actor
Marshall Kent (bowler) (born 1992), American ten-pin bowler